Louis Millo (5 September 1902 – 30 December 1983) was a French racing cyclist. He rode in the 1924 Tour de France.

References

1902 births
1983 deaths
French male cyclists
Place of birth missing